Greg Anaka  (died 20 April 1976) was from Winnipeg, Manitoba, and moved to Malton, Ontario in 1960.

He was president of the Malton Memorial Recreation Association Incorporated (MMRAI) which was instrumental in getting the Malton Arena built in 1968. The arena was the home of the Malton Minor Hockey Association.

He was a Director of the Mississauga Hockey League.

He was the first president of the Association for Children with Learning Disabilities - Mississauga Chapter.

In December 1973, Gregory Anaka was named to the Order of Canada and invested by Jules Léger April 1974.

Greg was inducted into the Mississauga Hockey League Hall of Fame in May 1976. The City of Mississauga named Anaka Drive in honour of his work in the Malton, Ontario community.

He died 20 April 1976.

References

External links
 Hall of Fame Honour Role - Greg Anaka 1976
 PDF of Mississauga Hockey League Yearbook 2009-10
 Mississauga Hockey League Yearbook - M.H.L. HALL OF FAME HONOUR ROLL - Greg Anaka 1976
 A V.I.P. and me: Greg Anaka. Mississauga News, April 11, 1973
 Gregory Anaka, C.M.  Mississauga, Ontario  Member of the Order of Canada  Awarded on December 17, 1973; Invested on April 3, 1974  For his leadership over many years in developing programmes of community action.
 PDF of Malton" Farms to Flying book by Kathleen A. Hicks 

1976 deaths
Members of the Order of Canada
People from Winnipeg
Year of birth missing